The Assistant Secretary of the Air Force for Financial Management and Comptroller (SAF/FM) is a civilian official in the United States Department of the Air Force.

Responsibilities 

According to U.S. law, there are five civilian Assistant Secretaries of the Air Force appointed by the President of the United States upon the advice and consent of the United States Senate. They assist the United States Secretary of the Air Force and the United States Under Secretary of the Air Force. One of the five assistant secretaries is the Assistant Secretary of the Air Force (Financial Management & Comptroller), who is responsible for "the exercise of the comptroller functions of the Department of the Air Force, including financial management functions." The duties expressly given to the Assistant Secretary of the Air Force (Financial Management & Comptroller) include determining the Department of the Air Force's budget estimates (in conjunction with the Under Secretary of Defense (Comptroller)), supervising the department's financial management system, and overseeing the department's asset management system. The assistant secretary is also responsible for developing a five-year plan for improving the department's financial management, which plan must be updated annually. The Assistant Secretary also must submit an annual report to the Secretary of the Air Force detailing the state of the department's financial management.

Subordinates 

The Assistant Secretary of the Air Force (Financial Management and Comptroller) is supported by a principal deputy as well as senior leaders responsible for budget, cost and economics, and financial operations.  The following are the key positions on the assistant secretary's staff.

Principal Deputy Assistant Secretary of the Air Force for Financial Management and Comptroller (SAF/FM), a civilian member of the Senior Executive Service

Deputy Assistant Secretary for Budget (SAF/FMB), a major general

Director for Budget Operations and Personnel (SAF/FMBO), a brigadier general
Director for Budget Investment (SAF/FMBI), a civilian member of the Senior Executive Service
Director for Budget Management and Execution (SAF/FMBM), a civilian member of the Senior Executive Service
Director for Budget Programs (SAF/FMBP), a colonel
Director for Budget and Appropriations Liaison (SAF/FMBL), a colonel  

Deputy Assistant Secretary for Cost and Economics (SAF/FMC), a civilian member of the Senior Executive Service

Deputy Assistant Secretary for Financial Operations (SAF/FMP), a civilian member of the Senior Executive Service
Chief Information Officer, a civilian member of the Senior Executive Service

The Assistant Secretary of the Air Force (Financial Management and Comptroller) also oversees the Air Force Financial Services Center, the Air Force Cost Analysis Agency, and the Financial Management Center of Expertise.

List of Assistant Secretaries of the Air Force (Financial Management & Comptroller)

The first three appointees served as Assistant Secretary of the Air Force (Management).  That office was re-designated as Assistant Secretary of the Air Force (Financial Management and Comptroller) on 1 August 1954.  The office of the Assistant Secretary of the Air Force (Financial Management and Comptroller) was disbanded on 27 March 1987.  At that time, all Air Force financial management functions were consolidated under the Air Force Comptroller (a military position filled by a lieutenant general).  The office of the Air Force Comptroller was disbanded on 1 July 1989 when the position of Assistant Secretary of the Air Force (Financial Management and Comptroller) was re-established.  Since that date, all Air Force financial management and comptroller functions have been directed by a presidentially appointed assistant secretary.

References

United States Air Force